The Villages Charter High School is a charter school serving the community and surrounding areas of The Villages, Florida. It is part of The Villages Charter Schools. The Villages High School is located at 251 Buffalo Trail The Villages, FL 32162.

Academics

Academies
Students entering their Junior year are required to select an academy that allows them to study in a major area of interest and can lead to professional certifications in the chosen field. Currently there are 7 academies to choose from:
Advanced Studies (Advanced Placement and Dual Enrollment)
Communication (TV Production or Journalism)
Engineering
Entrepreneurship (Graphic Arts or Culinary Arts)
Fine Arts (Art, Dance, or Music)
Information Technology
Health Sciences

Dual Enrollment
The Villages High School offers 79 credit hours of college courses through Lake–Sumter State College. Students are capable of earning an Associate of Arts degree by the time they graduate from the high school.

Advanced Placement
The Villages High School offers 7 Advanced Placement (AP) courses. The courses offered are (grade offered):
Music Theory (11–12)
Physics (11–12)
Language & Comp (11–12)
World History (10)
US History (11)
Government (12)
Statistics (12)

Athletics
The school mascot is the Buffalo. The Villages High School offers 24 varsity sports. The school competes as a member of the Florida High School Athletic Association. In 2014, The Villages High School will host Battle at The Villages for the inaugural tournament. The school also hosted the 2014 FACA North-South All-Star Football Classic.

References

Charter schools in Florida
Schools in Sumter County, Florida